Muscular Dystrophy UK is a UK charity focusing on muscular dystrophy and related conditions. They seek to cure or find treatments for muscular dystrophy and other muscle-wasting conditions, and to improve the lives of those affected.

The charity was founded in 1959 (then known as the Muscular Dystrophy Group and later as the Muscular Dystrophy Campaign) by Lord Walton of Detchant, to help families and children living with muscular dystrophy, and to raise money to fund research to find the causes of and cures for muscular dystrophy. Since then diagnosis of the different forms of muscular dystrophy and related muscle diseases has improved hugely and the charity now provides support for more than 60 different muscle-wasting conditions, as well as funding many key research developments.

Lord Attenborough served as the charity's President for 30 years, until 2002, when he became an Honorary Life President.
Lord Attenborough remained an inspirational supporter of the charity and the Richard Attenborough Fellowship Fund has been established to honor his commitment to world-class research.

Sue Barker took over the role of President in 2004, and is an active supporter, attending many charity events including the charity's annual national conferences.

Prince Philip became Patron of the charity in 1966.

References

External links
 

Health charities in the United Kingdom
Health in the London Borough of Southwark
Muscular dystrophy organizations
Organisations based in the London Borough of Southwark